Bole District is one of the seven districts in Savannah Region, Ghana. Originally created as an ordinary district assembly in 1988, until the northern part of the district was split off by a decree of president John Agyekum Kufuor on 27 August 2004 to create Sawla-Tuna-Kalba District; thus the remaining part has been retained as Bole District. The district assembly is located in the western part of Savannah Region and has Bole as its capital town.

See also

References

Districts of the Savannah Region (Ghana)